Rita Anderson Jarvis (1916–1982) was a British tennis player.

Jarvis, who attended Notting Hill and Ealing High School in Middlesex, made her first Wimbledon main draw appearance in 1936. She reached the singles fourth round of the 1951 Wimbledon Championships, losing to Jean Walker-Smith. As a doubles player she made quarter-finals at the French Championships and Wimbledon. During her first marriage, to Los Angeles tennis player Owen Anderson, she competed on tour as an American. She was divorced from Anderson in March 1953 and two months later married Czechoslovak-born Egyptian tennis player Jaroslav Drobný.

References

1916 births
1982 deaths
British female tennis players
American female tennis players
English female tennis players
Tennis people from Greater London